Kato Koryfi (before 1925: Κάτω Ράδοβος - Kato Radovos) is a village in Pella regional unit, Macedonia, Greece.

Kato Koryfi had 126 inhabitants in 1981. In fieldwork done by Riki Van Boeschoten in late 1993, Kato Koryfi was populated by Slavophones. The Macedonian language was used by people of all ages, both in public and private settings, and as the main language for interpersonal relationships. Some elderly villagers had little knowledge of Greek.

References

Populated places in Pella (regional unit)